Eubaculites is an extinct genus of cephalopods in the family Baculitidae and each known species was initially placed within the related genus Baculites until it was placed in a separate genus in 1926.

Eubaculites existed from the Turonian until the Danian, and is one of the very last species of ammonites, going extinct roughly 64.5 million years ago, which was around 500,000 years after the start of the Cenozoic. Specimens found in the Maastricht Formation in The Netherlands suggest that at least one species (E. carinatus) survived the K-Pg mass extinction event, albeit being restricted to the Danian.

References 

Prehistoric cephalopod genera
Ancyloceratina
Fossil taxa described in 1926